is the fifth live album by Japanese duo Pink Lady. Recorded live at Korakuen Stadium on July 23, 1978, the album was released on September 5, 1978. With over 100,000 fans in attendance, it was the largest concert headlined by the duo.

The album peaked at No. 12 on Oricon's weekly albums chart and sold over 48,000 copies.

Track listing

Charts

References

External links 

 
 

1978 live albums
Pink Lady (band) live albums
Japanese-language live albums
Victor Entertainment live albums